The 48th National Society of Film Critics Awards, given on 4 January 2014, honored the best in film for 2013.

48th NSFC Awards
January 4, 2014

Best Film:
 Inside Llewyn Davis

Winners 
Film titles are listed in order of placings:

Best Picture 
1. Inside Llewyn Davis 
2. American Hustle 
3. 12 Years a Slave
3. Her

Best Director 
1. Joel Coen and Ethan Coen – Inside Llewyn Davis 
2. Alfonso Cuarón – Gravity 
3. Steve McQueen – 12 Years a Slave

Best Actor 
1. Oscar Isaac – Inside Llewyn Davis 
2. Chiwetel Ejiofor – 12 Years a Slave 
3. Robert Redford – All Is Lost

Best Actress 
1. Cate Blanchett – Blue Jasmine 
2. Adèle Exarchopoulos – Blue Is the Warmest Colour  
3. Julie Delpy – Before Midnight

Best Supporting Actor 
1. James Franco – Spring Breakers 
2. Jared Leto – Dallas Buyers Club 
3. Barkhad Abdi – Captain Phillips

Best Supporting Actress 
1. Jennifer Lawrence – American Hustle 
2. Lupita Nyong'o – 12 Years a Slave 
3. Léa Seydoux – Blue Is the Warmest Colour 
3. Sally Hawkins – Blue Jasmine

Best Screenplay 
1. Richard Linklater, Ethan Hawke, and Julie Delpy – Before Midnight 
2. Joel Coen and Ethan Coen – Inside Llewyn Davis 
3. Eric Warren Singer and David O. Russell – American Hustle

Best Cinematography 
1. Bruno Delbonnel – Inside Llewyn Davis 
2. Emmanuel Lubezki – Gravity 
3. Phedon Papamichael – Nebraska

Best Non-Fiction Film 
1. The Act of Killing (TIE) 
1. At Berkeley (TIE) 
2. Leviathan

 Best Foreign-Language Film 
1. Blue Is the Warmest Colour
2. A Touch of Sin 
3. The Great Beauty

Film Heritage Awards 
 To the Museum of Modern Art, for its wide-ranging retrospective of the films of Allan Dwan.
 Too Much Johnson, the surviving reels from Orson Welles' first professional film. Discovered by Cinemazero (Pordenone) and Cineteca del Friuli, funded by the National Film Preservation Foundation, and restored by the George Eastman Museum.
 The British Film Institute for restorations of Alfred Hitchcock's nine silent features.
 To the DVD American Treasures from the New Zealand Film Archive.

References

2013 film awards
2013
2014 in American cinema